Edward Cuthbert "Terry" Driscoll, Jr. (born August 28, 1947) is a former American college athletics administrator and professional basketball player.  Until 2017, he served as athletic director at the College of William & Mary.

College career
Driscoll played at Boston College from 1966 to 1969. He was named Most Valuable Player of the 1969 National Invitational Tournament after leading his school to the tournament final against Temple University.

Professional career
After graduating, he was selected by the Detroit Pistons with the fourth pick of the 1969 NBA draft.
He played a season in the Italian Serie A with Virtus Bologna before joining the Pistons for the 1970–71 NBA season.

After one season with Detroit, he moved to the Baltimore Bullets in 1971, also staying a season. He then had two seasons with the Milwaukee Bucks and one with the ABA's Spirits of St. Louis, averaging 4.1 points per game and 4.1 rebounds per game over the course of his American professional career.

He spent the next five years in Italy as a player and then a coach, winning two Italian championships.

Career statistics

NBA

Regular season

|-
| align="left" | 1970–71
| align="left" | Detroit
| 69 || - || 18.2 || .415 || - || .701 || 5.8 || 0.8 || - || - || 5.4
|-
| align="left" | 1971–72
| align="left" | Baltimore
| 40 || - || 7.8 || .385 || - || .692 || 2.7 || 0.6 || - || - || 2.7
|-
| align="left" | 1972–73
| align="left" | Baltimore
| 1 || - || 5.0 || .000 || - || .000 || 3.0 || 0.0 || - || - || 0.0
|-
| align="left" | 1972–73
| align="left" | Milwaukee
| 59 || - || 16.3 || .429 || - || .694 || 5.0 || 0.9 || - || - || 5.5
|-
| align="left" | 1973–74
| align="left" | Milwaukee
| 64 || - || 10.9 || .471 || - || .652 || 3.1 || 0.8 || 0.3 || 0.3 || 3.2
|-
| align="left" | 1974-75
| align="left" | Milwaukee
| 11 || - || 4.7 || .231 || - || .500 || 1.5 || 0.3 || 0.1 || 0.0 || 0.6
|- class="sortbottom"
| style="text-align:center;" colspan="2"| Career
| 244 || - || 13.4 || .425 || - || .690 || 4.2 || 0.8 || 0.3 || 0.2 || 4.2
|}

Playoffs

|-
| align="left" | 1971–72
| align="left" | Baltimore
| 1 || - || 2.0 || 1.000 || - || 1.000 || 1.0 || 0.0 || - || - || 3.0
|-
| align="left" | 1972–73
| align="left" | Milwaukee
| 6 || - || 2.7 || .000 || - || .000 || 0.0 || 0.2 || - || - || 0.0
|-
| align="left" | 1973–74
| align="left" | Milwaukee
| 9 || - || 3.2 || .500 || - || 1.000 || 1.6 || 0.3 || 0.2 || 0.1 || 1.3
|- class="sortbottom"
| style="text-align:center;" colspan="2"| Career
| 16 || - || 2.9 || .400 || - || 1.000 || 0.9 || 0.3 || 0.2 || 0.1 || 0.9
|}

ABA

Regular season

|-
| align="left" | 1974–75
| align="left" | St. Louis
| 30 || - || 11.7 || .377 || .000 || .741 || 2.9 || 1.1 || 0.3 || 0.2 || 3.7
|}

Post-playing career
After leaving professional basketball, Driscoll worked in product marketing and sales for different sporting goods companies before moving to sports marketing and management. He worked as the Boston site venue executive director during the 1994 FIFA World Cup. Driscoll became the Athletic Director at William & Mary in 1995, succeeding John Randolph who had served ten years until he died from cancer. He held the position until his retirement on June 30, 2017. He was succeeded by Samantha Huge.

References

External links

1947 births
Living people
All-American college men's basketball players
American expatriate basketball people in Italy
American men's basketball players
Baltimore Bullets (1963–1973) players
Basketball coaches from Massachusetts
Basketball players from Massachusetts
Boston College Eagles men's basketball players
Boston College High School alumni
Detroit Pistons draft picks
Detroit Pistons players
Lega Basket Serie A players
Milwaukee Bucks players
New York Nets draft picks
People from Winthrop, Massachusetts
Small forwards
Spirits of St. Louis players
Virtus Bologna coaches
Virtus Bologna players
William & Mary Tribe athletic directors